Beth Rudin DeWoody (born 1952) is an American art patron, collector, curator, and philanthropist.

Biography
DeWoody was born to a Jewish family which controls a $5.1 billion real estate empire. She is the daughter of Gladyce (née Largever) and Lewis Rudin. She has one brother, William Rudin. Her parents later divorced and remarried: her father to Wilhelmina model Basha Szymanska, and then Rachel (Weingarten) Rudin; and her mother to film executive David Begelman.

DeWoody's interest in art started as child where she attended the Rudolf Steiner School after which she went on to earn a B.A. in anthropology and cinema studies from the University of California, Santa Barbara. She then worked as a production assistant on such movies as Hair (film) and Annie Hall. After marrying artist James DeWoody, she began to get deeply involved in the SoHo art scene where she began to nurture young contemporary artists such as E.V. Day and Tom Sachs. In 1982, she went to work for Rudin Management Company, owned by her father, where she rose to the rank of vice president. At the same time, she grew her art collection and sponsored new artists and served as a curator of exhibitions.

In 2001 comedian Ruby Wax portrayed a satirical menopausal maniac based on DeWoody in the BBC television comedy Absolutely Fabulous, season 4, episode 6.

Philanthropy
DeWoody serves as President of the Rudin Family Foundation, and sits on the boards of the Whitney Museum of American Art since the mid-1980s, Brooklyn Academy of Music, Creative Time, The New School University, Design Museum Holon in Israel, New Yorkers for Children, New York City Police Foundation, the Photography Steering Committee at the Norton Museum of Art located in West Palm Beach, Florida and the Hammer Museum in Los Angeles.

Personal life
DeWoody has been married twice. Her first husband was artist James DeWoody with whom she had two children: Kyle DeWoody (cofounder of Grey Area which markets artist-made wares) and artist and designer, Carlton. She was the fiancée to world renowned oculoplastic surgeon Stephen Bosniak, who died suddenly in 2007 of a leukemic crisis. In 2012, she remarried to photographer Firooz Zahedi. She has homes in West Palm Beach, Manhattan, the Hamptons, Los Angeles and Montecito, California.

The Bunker Artspace 
The Bunker Artspace, located in West Palm Beach, Florida, showcases contemporary art created by well-known and emerging artists currently in the DeWoody collection. Over 10,000 pieces are currently in the collection. Tom Sachs, Kehinde Wiley, Phillip Estland, Laura Dvorkin, John Waters, and Maynard Monrow are a few artists whose works DeWoody collects and displays at the Bunker.

References 

1952 births
Businesspeople from New York City
Jewish American philanthropists
American real estate businesspeople
Rudin family
American art curators
American art collectors
Women art collectors
Living people
Philanthropists from New York (state)
American women curators